Martins Okechukwu Justice (born September 29, 1977), popularly known by his stage name  J. Martins, is a Nigerian musician, singer, songwriter and producer. He is best known for his song "Oyoyo"  "Jupa"  and "Good Or Bad" J. Martins is also known to have featured on the song by P-Square, "E No Easy". He has also featured Phyno, YCEE, Fally Ipupa, DJ Arafat, Koffi Olomide, Timaya.

Early life 
J. Martins was born in Onitsha, Anambra State, Nigeria, and has family roots in Ohafia, Abia State.

Discography
 "Get Serious" (2008)
 "Elevated" (2009)
 "Selah" (2012)
 "Authenthic" (2016)

Selected singles

References

Living people
Nigerian male singer-songwriters
1977 births
21st-century Nigerian  male singers
Musicians from Anambra State
People from Onitsha